50,000,000 Elvis Fans Can't Be Wrong: Elvis' Gold Records, Volume 2 (or simply known as Elvis' Gold Records, Volume 2) is the fourth compilation album by  American singer and musician Elvis Presley, issued by RCA Victor  in November 1959. It is a compilation of hit singles released in 1958 and 1959 by Presley, from recording sessions going back as far as February 1957.

There has long been some confusion over the actual title of this album. The title is shown on the original record's labels as "Elvis' Gold Records, Vol. 2," with a comma and an abbreviation of "Volume", but on the jacket, it appears as "Elvis' Gold Records – Volume 2". The phrase "50,000,000 Elvis Fans Can't Be Wrong" does not appear on the labels on any of the original records, and it is the title of the records on the labels—not the jacket—that is usually given preference when conflicting titles appear on albums. Therefore, the phrase was not part of the original title of the album. Beginning no later than 1962, RCA Victor added "50,000,000 Elvis Fans Can't Be Wrong" to the labels of a few mono records and to the then newly released "electronically reprocessed stereo" records. The boasting on the label appears nearly exclusive to records manufactured at RCA Victor's Hollywood pressing plant; copies pressed at the other plants tended to use the proper title only. The '50,000,000' phrase remained there for several years, but by 1968, it was removed from the new orange RCA labels and was not found on any record labels for years afterward, but then it was added (again), this time to the compact disc releases of this album, where it has remained.

"Elvis' Gold Records, Vol. 2" peaked at number 31 on the Billboard Top Pop Albums chart. It was certified by the Recording Industry Association of America (RIAA) for a Gold Record Award (based on $1,000,000 in wholesale sales) on November 1, 1966. It was certified for a Platinum Record Award for sales of one million copies in the US on March 27, 1992.

Content
Elvis' Gold Records, Vol. 2 consists of both sides of five singles released during 1958 and 1959. Two sides made number 1 on the Billboard Hot 100, and six others reached the Top 10. In the 1950s, a Gold Record awarded to a single required certified sales of one million copies in the United States. This is different from the definition in use since the 1990s, when a Gold Record for a single was reduced to sales of 500,000 units.

Reissues
RCA first reissued the original 10 track album on compact disc in 1984; this issue, in reprocessed (fake) stereo sound was quickly withdrawn and the disc was reissued again in original monophonic. RCA reissued the album again in 1997 in a 20 track expanded edition, adding one A-side ("Hard Headed Woman") and one B-side ("Playing For Keeps"), along with tracks from top-selling EPs (e.g., "Peace In The Valley"). Several of those EP tracks were hit singles in other countries, notably the UK (i.e., "Santa Bring My Baby Back To Me"). The bonus tracks are interspersed within the original tracks, with the original running order of the album substantially altered.

The unified Billboard Hot 100 singles chart was not created until August, 1958. Chart positions for records (below) prior to this date were taken from the magazine's "Best Sellers in Stores" chart. In some cases, the early measurement of success of rock and roll records also came from the "Most Played on Jukeboxes" chart. Chart positions (below) for the bonus tracks on the CDs were taken from the peak position that the EP album achieved on Billboard's then extant EP chart (1957–60).

Legacy

The famous cover photo, of multiple images of Elvis wearing the gold lamé suit designed by Nudie's of Hollywood, has been copied many times. Album covers so inspired include:
 Phil Ochs' Greatest Hits album of 1970; not a "greatest hits" album at all but consisting of new original material, subtitled on the back cover "50 Phil Ochs Fans Can't Be Wrong!"
 The 1983 album by Rod Stewart, Body Wishes;
 The Elvis Costello & The Attractions bootleg album of the same name from the 1980s.
 Blues Traveler's more modest 1,000,000 People Can't Be Wrong of 1994.
 Blumfeld's second studio album L'Etat Et Moi from 1995.
 The Fall's compilation 50,000 Fall Fans Can't Be Wrong from 2004.
 100,000,000 Bon Jovi Fans Can't Be Wrong, also from 2004.
 50,000,000 Soulwax Fans Can't Be Wrong from 2005.

The meme has also been adopted to other media, such as:
 The 1982 bootleg Elvis' Greatest Shit, a compilation of tracks and out-takes that the bootlegger considered among Presley's worst recordings, is subtitled "50,000,000 Elvis Fans Can Be Wrong".
 The second album by the group Dread Zeppelin, which is fronted by an Elvis impersonator, from 1991 is titled 5,000,000 in reference to this album; the footnote says "*Tortelvis Fans Can't Be Wrong."  The cover more obviously parodies Led Zeppelin's fourth album.
 The title used verbatim in the lyrics to "The Thanksgiving Song", by Adam Sandler in 1993.
 The 1997 documentary by Joe Franklin 50,000,000 Joe Franklin Fans Can't Be Wrong.
 Marilyn Manson's 1998 book The Long Hard Road Out of Hell contains a chapter entitled "Fifty Million Screaming Christians Can't Be Wrong".
 Mindless Self Indulgence's song "You'll Rebel To Anything" from their 2005 album of the same name contains the lyrics, "you're telling me that 50,000,000 screaming fans are never wrong, I'm telling you that 50,000,000 screaming fans are fucking morons".
 Die! Die! Die!'s self-titled debut features a song named "Franz (17 Die! Die! Die! Fans Can't Be Wrong)" in 2006.
 Stephan Pastis, author of comic strip Pearls Before Swine, released a collection in 2010 titled "50,000,000 Pearls Fans Can't Be Wrong."
 In 2013, the band Supersuckers released a free digital EP entitled 50,000 Middle Fingers Can't Be Wrong.
 Doc Yewll references this album while talking with T'evgin in the Defiance 3rd-season episode, The Last Unicorns.

Title meanings
The blurb "50,000,000 Elvis Fans Can't Be Wrong" that became an on-and-off part of the album's title originated with a one-page article titled "Can Fifty Million Americans Be Wrong" by Les Brown that appeared in the September 19, 1956, issue of Down Beat magazine. The article was an unfavorable look at Elvis and his fans, with Brown bemoaning the lack of appreciation of the "fine talents" of Jeri Southern, Dick Haymes, and "other serious vocal artists." The article concludes, "The educational responsibility seems to fall mainly on the disc jockey, who still has the greatest proximity to, and the greatest influence over, the record-buying public. Fifty million Americans can easily be misled."  The article was written in response to a statement from Steve Sholes, Elvis' producer, estimating that fifty million Elvis Presley records had been sold over the course of his career up to that point. Sholes said: "Every record Elvis has ever made for us has sold over a million.  Since January, 1956, we've sold 50 million Elvis Presley records in this country alone, not counting foreign sales or albums."

The expression "Fifty Million Frenchmen Can't Be Wrong," originating in a 1927 song by Willie Raskin, Billy Rose, and Fred Fisher and performed by Sophie Tucker, predated its use in Brown's article. The song prompted the creation of a popular snowclone about fifty million people being wrong. Methodist pastor J. Resler Shultz of Harrisburg, PA, used "Can fifty million Americans be wrong" as the title of a sermon in 1931. Articles with similar titles have appeared somewhat frequently since that time—some being about food, politics, or religion.

Track listing
Chart positions for LPs and EPs from Billboard Top Pop Albums chart; positions for singles from Billboard Pop Singles chart

Original release

1997 reissue with bonus tracks

Follow That Dream re-issue

Chart performance

References

External links
 
LPM-2075 50,000,000 Elvis Fans Can't Be Wrong, Elvis' Gold Records, Volume 2 Guide part of The Elvis Presley Record Research Database

Snowclones
Albums produced by Steve Sholes
Elvis Presley compilation albums
1959 greatest hits albums
RCA Victor compilation albums
1950s neologisms
Quotations from music